Angel Pepelyankov (born 28 April 1949) is a Bulgarian modern pentathlete. He competed at the 1972 Summer Olympics.

References

External links
 

1949 births
Living people
Bulgarian male modern pentathletes
Olympic modern pentathletes of Bulgaria
Modern pentathletes at the 1972 Summer Olympics
Sportspeople from Pazardzhik